Hampole is a civil parish in the metropolitan borough of Doncaster, South Yorkshire, England.  The parish contains ten listed buildings that are recorded in the National Heritage List for England.  All the listed buildings are designated at Grade II, the lowest of the three grades, which is applied to "buildings of national importance and special interest".  The parish contains the villages of Hampole and Skelbrooke, and the surrounding countryside.  Most of the listed buildings are houses and associated structures and farm buildings, and the others consist of a seat by a well, a church, and two grave slabs in the churchyard.


Buildings

References

Citations

Sources

 

Lists of listed buildings in South Yorkshire
Buildings and structures in the Metropolitan Borough of Doncaster